Klwatka Królewska  is a village in the administrative district of Gmina Gózd, within Radom County, Masovian Voivodeship, in east-central Poland.

References

Villages in Radom County